Thomas Jefferson University is a private research university in Philadelphia, Pennsylvania. Established in its earliest form in 1824, the university officially combined with Philadelphia University in 2017. To signify its heritage, the university sometimes carries the nomenclature Jefferson (Philadelphia University + Thomas Jefferson University) in its branding. It is classified among "R2: Doctoral Universities – High research activity".

The university is named for U.S. Founding Father
and president Thomas Jefferson.

History
Thomas Jefferson University was founded in 1824 and merged with another university located in same city, Philadelphia University, in 2017. Philadelphia University was originally known as Philadelphia Textile School when it was founded in 1884, and then Philadelphia Textile Institute for 20 years (1942 to 1961), Philadelphia College of Textiles & Science for 58 years (1962 to 1999), and Philadelphia University for 18 years (1999 to 2017), its final name before merger with Thomas Jefferson University.

Philadelphia University
At the 1876 Centennial Exposition, local textile manufacturers noticed that Philadelphia's textile industry was falling behind its rivals' capacity, technology, and ability. In 1880, they formed the Philadelphia Association of Manufacturers of Textile Fabrics, with Theodore C. Search as its president, to fight for higher tariffs on imported textiles and to educate local textile leaders.  Search joined the board of directors of the Philadelphia Museum and School of Industrial Art (now the Philadelphia Museum of Art and the University of the Arts), thinking it the perfect partner for his plans for a school, and began fundraising in 1882.

In early 1884, Search himself taught the first classes of the Philadelphia Textile School to five students at 1336 Spring Garden Street. The school was officially opened on November 5, 1884. The school moved to 1303-1307 Buttonwood Street in 1891, then moved again in 1893.

Enrollment had been growing steadily and the school was turning away "bright young fellows" for lack of space.  The School acquired the former Philadelphia Institute of the Deaf and Dumb on the corner of Broad and Spruce Streets, which allowed rapid expansion of academic offerings and capacity of students.

In 1942, the school was granted the right to award baccalaureate degrees and changed its name to the Philadelphia Textile Institute (PTI). In 1949, having decided to break its ties with the museum, PTI moved to its present site in the East Falls section of Philadelphia.

In 1961, the school changed its name again, to Philadelphia College of Textiles & Science, but was still known as Philadelphia Textile for short. The university's student population doubled between 1954 and 1964, and doubled again by 1978, with programs in the arts, sciences, and business administration being introduced. The college purchased an adjoining property in 1972, doubling the size of its campus. In 1976, it offered its first graduate degree, the Master of Business Administration. The purchase of additional properties in East Falls in 1980 and 1988 nearly doubled the campus again, adding classrooms, research laboratories, student residences, and athletic facilities. In 1992, the  Paul J. Gutman Library opened.

During the 1990s, the college began to offer undergraduate majors in a wider range of fields, resulting in the college being granted university status by the Commonwealth of Pennsylvania in 1999. The Board of Trustees voted to change the college's name to Philadelphia University, on July 13, 1999. The school preferred the longer abbreviation of "PhilaU", rather than the simple two-letter abbreviation of "PU", due to the latter's oft-mocked connection with other "PU"-abbreviated schools as an onomatopoetic term for body odor.

Thomas Jefferson University

Thomas Jefferson University began as a medical school. During the early 19th century, several attempts to create a second medical school in Philadelphia had been stymied, largely by University of Pennsylvania School of Medicine alumni. In an attempt to circumvent that opposition, a group of Philadelphia physicians led by George McClellan sent an 1824 letter to the trustees of Jefferson College (now Washington & Jefferson College) in Canonsburg, Pennsylvania, asking them to establish a medical department in Philadelphia. The trustees agreed, establishing the Medical Department of Jefferson College in Philadelphia in 1825. In response to a second request, the Pennsylvania General Assembly granted an expansion of Jefferson College's charter in 1826, endorsing the creation of the new department and allowing it to grant medical degrees. An additional 10 Jefferson College trustees, including Joel Barlow Sutherland, were appointed to supervise the new facility from Philadelphia, owing to the difficulty of managing a medical department on the other side of the state. Two years later, this second board was granted authority to manage the Medical Department, while the Jefferson College trustees maintained veto power for major decisions.

The first class was graduated in 1826, receiving their degrees only after the disposition of a lawsuit seeking to close the school. The first classes were held in the Tivoli Theater on Prune Street in Philadelphia, which had the first medical clinic attached to a medical school. Owing to the teaching philosophy of Dr. McClellan, classes focused on clinical practice. In 1828, the Medical Department moved to the Ely Building, which allowed for a large lecture space and the "Pit," a 700-seat amphitheater to allow students to view surgeries. This building had an attached hospital, the second such medical school/hospital arrangement in the nation, servicing 441 inpatients and 4,659 outpatients in its first year of operation. The future founder of gynecology J. Marion Sims studied there from 1834 to 1835, when he graduated. The relationship with Jefferson College survived until 1838, when the Medical Department received a separate charter, allowing it to operate separately as the Jefferson Medical College. At this time, all instructors, including McClellan, were vacated from the school and the trustees hired all new individuals to teach. This has been considered the time at which the school came to be considered a "legitimate" medical school.

In 1841, Jefferson Medical College hired what would be dubbed "The Faculty of '41", an influential collection of professors including Charles Delucena Meigs and Mütter Museum founder Thomas Dent Mütter. This collection of professors would institute numerous changes to Jefferson—including providing patient beds over a shop at 10th and Sansom Streets in 1844—and the staff would remain unchanged for 15 years.  The graduating class of 1849 included a son of college founder Joel Barlow Sutherland, Charles Sutherland, who went on to serve as Surgeon General of the United States Army.

In 1882, a Philadelphia Press newspaper story sparked a sensational trial after a journalist caught body snatchers stealing corpses and providing them to Jefferson Medical College for use as cadavers by medical students.  Four grave robbers were arrested and sentenced to Moyamensing Prison for stealing bodies and selling them to Jefferson Medical College at the rate of $8 a body.  After the arrests, it was determined that the body snatching had been going on for nine years and several hundred corpses had been sold to Jefferson Medical College.

The renowned surgeon and Jefferson Medical College anatomy professor, William S. Forbes, was arrested for his role in the grave robbery but was acquitted  Forbes helped write the 1867 Pennsylvania Law named the "Anatomy Act" which called for hospitals, prisons and mental health wards to provide the bodies of those that had no family or funds for burial to medical schools for anatomical research.

Due in part to the Lebanon Cemetery grave robbery scandal, the Pennsylvania Anatomy Act of 1883 was passed which provided for legal means by which medical colleges could obtain cadavers without having to buy them from grave robbers.

A 125-bed hospital, one of the first in the nation affiliated with a medical school, opened in 1877, and a school for nurses began in 1891. The Medical College became Thomas Jefferson University on July 1, 1969. As an academic health care center, Jefferson is currently involved in education, medical research, and patient care. Jefferson Medical College is the 9th oldest American medical school that is in existence today.

In January 2007, the university sold Thomas Eakins' painting The Gross Clinic, which depicts a surgery that took place at the school, for $68 million, to the Pennsylvania Academy of the Fine Arts, in association with the Philadelphia Museum of Art. A reproduction hangs in its place at Jefferson University.

On June 17, 2014, Sidney Kimmel Foundation donated $110 million to Jefferson Medical College, prompting the announcement that Jefferson Medical College would be renamed Sidney Kimmel Medical College. It was the largest donation received in its history.

Merger
In May 2017, Thomas Jefferson University and Philadelphia University announced that they would merge under the name Thomas Jefferson University.

Academics

Jefferson offers 160+ undergraduate and graduate programs, including the Sidney Kimmel Medical College and former Philadelphia University's flagship colleges:

College of Architecture and the Built Environment
Kanbar College of Design, Engineering and Commerce
School of Continuing and Professional Studies

Campus
There are two campuses and a research center.

East Falls

The university's East Falls  wooded campus is located ten minutes northwest of Center City, Philadelphia, accessible by two of SEPTA's Regional Rail lines. The campus consists of 52 buildings, including classrooms, laboratories, studios, the Paul J. Gutman Library, student resident facilities, an exhibition gallery, and some major additions early in the 21st Century, the  Kanbar Campus Center for students, faculty and staff; the Gallagher Athletic, Recreation and Convocation Center; the SEED Center (certified LEED Gold Center for Sustainability, Energy Efficiency and Design), and the innovative DEC Center. A subsidiary campus is located in Bucks County.

Downtown

The university's center city Philadelphia campus, medical offices, and hospital (called Jefferson Health) are headquartered at 130 South Ninth Street and surrounding city blocks.

Manayunk Research Center
In addition to its major properties, Jefferson runs the Philadelphia University Research Center, which is housed in a restored textile mill (originally opened in 1864) in the Manayunk section of Philadelphia, just south of the main campus. The research center contains both the Engineering and Design Institute and the Laboratory for Engineered Human Protection.

Athletics
Jefferson's athletic teams are known as the Rams. The college is a member of the Division II level of the National Collegiate Athletic Association (NCAA), primarily competing as a member of the Central Atlantic Collegiate Conference (CACC) since the 2020–21 academic year. The Rams previously competed in the East Coast Conference (originally known as the New York Collegiate Athletic Conference until 2006) from 1991–92 to 2004–05.

Jefferson sponsors 17 varsity intercollegiate teams: Men's sports include baseball, basketball, cross country, golf, soccer, tennis  and track & field; while women's sports include basketball, cross country, golf, lacrosse, rowing, soccer, softball, tennis, track & field and volleyball.

The merged school chose to retain PhilaU's nickname and the athletic program follows the overall institution in using the branding of "Jefferson" when describing the university as a whole.

The university is known for its men's basketball program, particularly coach Herb Magee, who became the most successful men's basketball coach in NCAA history on February 23, 2010, and was inducted into the Class of 2011 of the Naismith Memorial Basketball Hall of Fame. Magee served 54 years as coach at Philadelphia University, highlighted by an NCAA Division II Basketball Championship in 1970. Magee was awarded the honorary degree of Doctor of Humane Letters by President Stephen Spinelli Jr. at Philadelphia University's 125th Commencement in 2009.

The university women's basketball program is under athletic director and women's basketball coach Tom Shirley. Shirley, who has been the university's director of athletics since 1992, has won 607 games, which places him sixth on the NCAA DII career wins list and 30th on the NCAA all-divisions career coaching wins list. On January 19, 2011, Shirley took his 600th win as the Rams defeated Chestnut Hill College 76–60.

Bob File played for the PhilaU Rams men's baseball program.

In the 2006–2007 season, Philadelphia University started a rowing program under head coach Chris O'Brien. In its inaugural season it won the Dad Vail Regatta in the Women's Novice Heavy Eight. The 2008–2009 season was also notable for the success of the men's and women's tennis teams, with both winning the CACC championships.

Jefferson Women's Soccer is the first program to win three straight CACC titles in women's soccer since at least the 2000 season, according to available records.  Jefferson 's win in 2021 comes after consecutive wins in 2019 and 2020.  This marked the Rams' sixth CACC Championship in program history. In 2021, Jefferson also earned its fourth NCAA Tournament appearance (2014, 2015, 2019), and the Rams made back-to-back trips for the second time. There was no NCAA Tournament contested in the 2020-21 academic year due to the COVID-19 pandemic.

Notable alumni
Adrian Brooks ('78), former professional soccer player.
James P. Bagian, physician, engineer, and former NASA astronaut. 
Pat Chambers, Penn State University men's basketball coach.
Jacob Mendes Da Costa, discoverer of Da Costa's syndrome.
Bob File, ex-Major League Baseball player, Toronto Blue Jays.
Carlos Finlay, pioneer in the research of yellow fever, determining that it was transmitted through Aedes aegypti.
William S. Forbes, professor of anatomy. 
John Heysham Gibbon, inventor of the heart-lung machine; awarded the Lasker Prize. 
Robert Gallo, discoverer of the Human Immunodeficiency Virus; awarded the Lasker Prize twice.
Kermit Gosnell, abortion provider and convicted murderer.
Samuel D. Gross, academic trauma surgeon; referred to as "The Emperor of American Surgery". 
Malcolm C. Grow, first Surgeon General of the United States Air Force.
Chevalier Jackson, father of endoscopy (alongside Philipp Bozzini).
Maurice Kanbar ('52, H'03), inventor and philanthropist.
Herbert Kleber, psychiatrist and substance abuse researcher.
William Williams Keen, first neurosurgeon to successfully remove a brain tumor. 
Curtis King, ex-Major League Baseball player, St. Louis Cardinals.
Howard Krein, physician, surgeon, venture capitalist
Sundar Kumarasamy, Philadelphia University graduate, higher education expert.
Robert G. Lahita, physician, internist and rheumatologist, best known for research into systemic lupus erythematosus and other autoimmune diseases.
Herb Magee, head coach of the Jefferson men's basketball team. 
Marty Makary, surgeon, professor, and author. 
Silas Weir Mitchell, father of medical neurology. 
Jay McCarroll, winner of Bravo's inaugural season of Project Runway.
David L. Reich ('82), academic anesthesiologist and professor; President & Chief Operating Officer of the Mount Sinai Hospital, and President of Mount Sinai Queens.
Charles E. de M. Sajous (1878), pioneer of endocrinology
Richard Smeyne, neuroscientist
Jacob da Silva Solis-Cohen, performed the first laryngotomy for vocal cord cancer.
Benjamin Starnes, vascular surgeon, medical researcher, and Alexander Whitehill Clowes Endowed Chair in Vascular surgery at the University of Washington
Edward John Wherry III (Ph.D. 2000) immunologist and professor
Greg Wilson, former coach of Rams' men's soccer, and professional player.

References

External links
 Official website
 Thomas Jefferson athletics website

 
Universities and colleges in Philadelphia
Educational institutions established in 1884
Architecture schools in Pennsylvania
Educational institutions established in 1999
1884 establishments in Pennsylvania
East Falls, Philadelphia
Private universities and colleges in Pennsylvania